Pahnabad (also Romanized as Pahnābād; also known as Pahnāvar and Pahnehbor) is a village in Sangestan Rural District, in the Central District of Hamadan County, Hamadan Province, Iran. At the 2006 census, its population was 163, in 37 families.

References 

Populated places in Hamadan County